JPE may refer to:

 The Journal of Political Economy, a leading economics journal published by the University of Chicago
 The Journal of Political Ecology, a leading interdisciplinary journal published by the University of Arizona
 The Journal of Photonics for Energy
 .jpe (file extension) for JPEG images
 JPE (assembly language) instruction for jump if parity even, see x86 instruction listings
 Joint Planning Environment of the U.S. Joint Planning and Development Office
 Jonathan Palmer Evolution, a car produced by Caterham Cars
 Juan Ponce Enrile, Filipino politician
 Japanese Pidgin English

See also

 JPEG (disambiguation)
 JPG (disambiguation)